Yalakom Provincial Park is a provincial park in British Columbia, Canada, located 60 kilometres northwest of Lillooet, British Columbia.  The park, which is 8941 ha. in size, was established in 2010.

External links
Backgrounder

Provincial parks of British Columbia
Protected areas established in 2010
2010 establishments in British Columbia